Ana Pastor may refer to:

 Ana Pastor (politician) (born 1957), a Spanish politician
 Ana Pastor (journalist) (born 1977), a Spanish journalist and anchorwoman